Abduli Zalyab (also Romanized as ʿAbdūlī Zālyāb) is a village in Kuhdasht-e Jonubi Rural District, in the Central District of Kuhdasht County, Lorestan Province, Iran. At the 2006 census, its population was 16, in 4 families.

References 

Towns and villages in Kuhdasht County